The Trinidad and Tobago national basketball team represents Trinidad and Tobago in international basketball competitions. It is administrated by the National Basketball Federation of Trinidad and Tobago. (NBFTT)

The team won four straight gold medals from 1986–1990 in the FIBA CBC Championship. Overall, Trinidad and Tobago has six total medals in this tournament and is second in the medal list only one behind the Bahamas which has seven.

Trinidad and Tobago's last official squad was for the 2010 Centrobasket in Santo Domingo. There, Trinidad and Tobago was the only team that defeated the eventual champion Puerto Rico.

History
In the 2009 CBC Trinidad finished in fourth place with a 3–0 record led by Ian Young who averaged 18.6 PPG and Wilferd Benjamin who averaged 12.4 PPG and led their team with a total of 45 rebounds. A close second was Julius Ashby who had 41 rebounds.

Competitions

Summer Olympics
yet to qualify

FIBA World Cup
yet to qualify

FIBA AmeriCup
yet to qualify

Centrobasket

1971 : 6th
1987 : 6th 
1989 : 9th
2010 : 10th

Caribbean Championship

Commonwealth Games

never participated

Current roster

At the 2010 Centrobasket: (last publicized squad)

Depth chart

Notable players
Other current notable players from Trinidad and Tobago:

Kit

Manufacturer
2010: Adidas

See also
Trinidad and Tobago women's national basketball team
Trinidad and Tobago national under-19 basketball team
Trinidad and Tobago national under-17 basketball team
Trinidad and Tobago national 3x3 team

References

External links
Official website
Presentation at CaribbeanBasketball.com
Archived records of Trinidad and Tobago team participations
LatinBasket – Trinidad and Tobago Men National Team
Presentation on Facebook
Trinidad and Tobago at FIBA.com

Men's national basketball teams
Sport in Trinidad and Tobago
Basketball
Basketball in Trinidad and Tobago
Basketball teams in Trinidad and Tobago
1958 establishments in Trinidad and Tobago